Southam Road and Harbury railway station was a railway station, located  east of Harbury, and  south-west of Southam, Warwickshire.

History
The station was brick-built and had a goods siding.

British Railways closed the station to goods traffic on 11 November 1963, and to passengers on 2 November 1964. It was subsequently demolished and few traces remain. The route is now part of the Chiltern Main Line.

Route

See also
Southam and Long Itchington railway station

Notes

References

External links
Southam Road and Harbury station on navigable 1954 O.S. map 
Southam Road and Harbury station today 
Southam Road and Harbury station on Warwickshire Railways

Disused railway stations in Warwickshire
Former Great Western Railway stations
Railway stations in Great Britain opened in 1852
Railway stations in Great Britain closed in 1964
Beeching closures in England
1852 establishments in England